Randy Waldman (born September 8, 1955, Chicago, Illinois, United States) is an American pianist, arranger, composer, and conductor. In 2019, Waldman's arrangement of the "Spider-Man Theme" on his Superheroes album garnered the Grammy Award for Best Arrangement, Instrumental and Vocals at the 61st Grammy Awards. Waldman also co-arranged Barbra Streisand's "Somewhere", which was awarded with an arrangement Grammy in 1985. He has served as Streisand's pianist and conductor for over 35 years and has worked with numerous artists including Frank Sinatra, Michael Jackson, Whitney Houston, Beyoncé, Ray Charles, and Stevie Wonder. He is also a helicopter and airplane pilot and instructor and holds a 2003 flight speed record in a Bell OH-58 helicopter.

Early life
Waldman was born in Chicago, Illinois on September 8, 1955. Waldman began playing piano at age five at which time he was considered a child prodigy. He was hired to demonstrate pianos at a local piano store at age 12. While in high school, he performed with the Northwestern University Jazz band.

Career
At the age of 21, Waldman was hired to go on tour as the pianist for Frank Sinatra. He was then hired by The Lettermen to go on tour from Chicago to Los Angeles. After the tour, Waldman relocated to Los Angeles and, within a year, he toured with Minnie Riperton, Lou Rawls, Paul Anka, and George Benson, the last of whom kept Waldman around as his pianist, musical director, and arranger for the following seven years.

Eventually, Waldman began a session career in Los Angeles that would go on to span 40 years. He has performed on hundreds of albums, motion picture soundtracks, television shows, and jingles. In the 1980s, Waldman worked on soundtracks such as Ghostbusters, Romancing the Stone, Back to the Future, Nuts, Beetlejuice, Salsa, Who Framed Roger Rabbit, The Abyss, and Weekend at Bernie's.

In 1983, Waldman was nominated for a Grammy for Best Vocal Arrangement for The Manhattan Transfer's "Code of Ethics", from their album Bodies and Souls. Two years later, Waldman's co-arrangement of the West Side Story song "Somewhere", on Barbra Streisand's The Broadway Album, won a Grammy. Waldman has been Streisand’s pianist for over 35 years and is featured on many of her albums, movies, and live performances.

In the 1990s, Waldman worked on the soundtracks for numerous films including Forrest Gump, The Bodyguard, Mission: Impossible, and Titanic. He also worked with numerous artists over the course of his career including Barbra Streisand, Michael Jackson, Paul McCartney, Patti LaBelle, Celine Dion, Beyoncé, Madonna, Whitney Houston, Olivia Newton-John, Barry Manilow, Ray Charles, The Stylistics, Michael Bublé, Quincy Jones, Johnny Mathis, Stevie Wonder, Andrea Bocelli, John Travolta, Kenny G, Katey Sagal, and others.

In 1998, Waldman released his first solo album, Wigged Out, on his own WhirlyBird Records, featuring bassist John Pattitucci and drummer Vinnie Colaiuta. The album consisted of a collection of classical songs reworked with jazz arrangements. His second album, UnReel, was released in 2001 and featured a variety of soundtrack and theme music from many different films and television shows. In 2002, he worked on the soundtrack for Ice Age before releasing a third album, Timing is Everything, in 2003.

In 2017, Waldman appeared on Seal's Standards album which features Frank Sinatra's songs. He was also Barbra Streisand's pianist, music director, and conductor for her Barbra: The Music, The Mem'ries, The Magic tour. A filmed version of one of the shows was released on Netflix in November 2017. In September 2018, he released the studio album, Superheroes, with Vinnie Colaiuta on drums and Carlitos Del Puerto on bass. The album also featured guest appearances from artists like Chick Corea, Wynton Marsalis, George Benson, Take 6, Chris Potter, and several others. Waldman's arrangement of the album's "Spiderman Theme" would go on to win the Grammy Award for Best Arrangement, Instrumental and Vocals at the 61st Grammy Awards in 2019. His arrangement of the "Batman Theme" was also nominated for the Grammy Award for Best Arrangement, Instrumental or A Cappella.

Selected discography

Studio albums

Songwriting, instrumental, and production

Nominations and awards

References

External links
Randy Waldman's Official Website

American session musicians
Musicians from Chicago
Living people
1955 births
Helicopter pilots
American aviation record holders
Rotorcraft flight record holders
20th-century American pianists
American male pianists
Grammy Award winners
21st-century American pianists
20th-century American male musicians
21st-century American male musicians